Macrocentrus is a genus of braconid wasps in the family Braconidae. There are at least 180 described species in Macrocentrus.

See also
 List of Macrocentrus species

References

Further reading

External links

 

Parasitic wasps